Autumn is the second solo piano album by pianist George Winston, released in 1980. It was re-issued in 2001 with a bonus track "Too Much Between Us" on the Dancing Cat label. The album was certified Platinum by the RIAA.

The Indiana rock band Brazil sampled a portion of "Sea" for the beginning of the song "It Keeps the Machine Running" from their Dasein EP. Winston does not receive credit in the liner notes.

Track listing

2001 20th Anniversary Edition

Charts

References

1980 albums
George Winston albums
Windham Hill Records albums
Dancing Cat Records albums